Chamaelaucium megalopetalum, is a flowering plant commonly known as the large waxflower, is a member of the family Myrtaceae endemic to Western Australia.

It blooms between May and December producing white-pink-red or cream-yellow flowers.

Found on sandy ridges or sand plains in the southern Wheatbelt, Great Southern and the south coast of the Goldfields-Esperance regions of Western Australia where it grows in sand or gravelly soils over laterite.

References

megalopetalum
Plants described in 1867